Enrico "Eric" Smith Quizon (born January 20, 1967) is a Filipino actor, director, producer, writer and comedian. He is the 12th child of the late comedian-actor, Dolphy. He is also a co-owner of Café Famous in Greenbelt, Makati. In late 2022, Quizon is tapped to become the head of Net 25's newest talent management arm, NET25 Star Center.

Early life
Enrico Smith Quizon was born on January 20, 1967, the second of four children born to Pamela Ponti. He has 13 half siblings.

Awards
FAMAS Awards

1990 - Nominated for Best Supporting Actor for Pahiram Ng Isang Umaga (1989)	
1992 - Won Best Supporting Actor for Hihintayin Kita Sa Langit (1991)

Gawad Urian Awards
1990 - Won Best Supporting Actor (Pinakamahusay na Pangalawang Aktor) for Pahiram Ng Isang Umaga (1989)
2004 - Nominated for Best Supporting Actor (Pinakamahusay na Pangalawang Aktor) for Crying Ladies (2003)

Metro Manila Film Festival
2003 - Won Best Actor for Crying Ladies (2003)
1991- Won Best Actor for Mongolian Barbecue (1991)

Star Awards for movies
1990 - Won Supporting Actor of the Year for Pahiram Ng Isang Umaga (1989)
1999 - Darling of the Press

Filmography

Film

Computer Man (1990-1992) TV
Lovingly Yours, Helen (1990)
Ready, Get Set Go! (1991–1993) - host
Buddy en Sol (1991–1993)
Sine Siete (GMA 1992)
GMA Telecine Specials (1994)
Spotlight on Eric Quizon (1994)
GMA True Stories (1996)
GMA Love Stories (1997)
Mikee Drama Series (1997)
Maynila (2000)
Road Trip (2002) .... Host

Television

Director
Quizon CT (2022) Net 25
Pasión de Amor (2015) ABS-CBN
Maalaala Mo Kaya (2014) ABS-CBN
Ipaglaban Mo! (2014) ABS-CBN
Enchanted Garden (2012) (with Joel Lamangan and BB. Joyce Bernal) TV5
Isang Dakot Na Luha (2012) TV5
Glamorosa (2011–2012) (with BB. Joyce Bernal) TV5
Babaeng Hampaslupa (2011) (with BB. Joyce Bernal) TV5
My Driver Sweet Lover TV series (2010) (with Soxie Topacio) TV series
Nobody, Nobody But... Juan (2009) (as Enrico Quizon)
Asian Treasures (2007) TV Series
Majika (2006) TV Series
Wrinkles (2006)
Darna (2005) TV Series
Marinara (2004) TV Series
Narito Ang Puso Ko (2003) TV Series (as Enrico Quizon)
Home Alone Da Riber (2002) (as Enrico S. Quizon)
Daddy O!, Baby O! (2000) (as Enrico S. Quizon)
Dito sa Puso Ko (1999) (as Enrico S. Quizon)
Ms. Kristina Moran, Ang Babaeng Palaban (1999) (as Enrico S. Quizon)
Sumigaw Ka Hanggang Gusto Mo (1999) (as Enrico S. Quizon)
Pusong Mamon (1998) (as Enrico Quizon)
Pagdating ng Panahon (1998) (as Enrico Quizon)
Langit sa Piling Mo (1997) (as Enrico S. Quizon)
Lucio & Miguel (1992) (as Enrico Quizon)

Producer
Dito Sa Puso Ko (1999) (as Enrico Quizon)
Ms. Kristina Moran, Ang Babaeng Palaban (1999) (as Enrico Quizon)
Sumigaw Ka Hanggang Gusto Mo (1999) (as Enrico Quizon)
Pusong Mamon (1998) (as Enrico Quizon)
Pagdating Ng Panahon (1998) (executive producer) (as Enrico S. Quizon)
Langit Sa Piling Mo (1997) (executive producer) (as Enrico S. Quizon)
Wanted Perfect Murder (1996) (producer) (as Enrico Quizon)
Buddy en Sol 2: Pribate Depektibs (1992) (as Enrico Quizon)
Buddy en Sol (Sine ito) (1992) (as Enrico Smith Quizon)
Lucio & Miguel (1992) (as Enrico Quizon)

Writer
Ms. Kristina Moran, Ang Babaeng Palaban (1999) (as Enrico S. Quizon)
Pagdating Ng Panahon (1998) (as Enrico S. Quizon)
Langit Sa Piling Mo (1997) (as Enrico S. Quizon)

References

External links

1967 births
Living people
20th-century Filipino writers
21st-century Filipino writers
Male actors from Manila
Filipino film directors
Filipino film producers
Filipino male comedians
Filipino people of American descent
Filipino people of Chinese descent
Filipino screenwriters
Filipino television personalities
Kapampangan people
Eric
ABS-CBN personalities
GMA Network personalities
TV5 (Philippine TV network) personalities